Azat Mashurovich Mashurov (March 27, 1940 – April 15, 2000) was a prominent public figure in Kazakhstan's Uyghur community. He served as the First Secretary of the Communist Party of Alakol District in Taldykorgan Province from 1980–1989. He helped drastically improve Alakol's economy, bringing Usharal, its administrative center, to a city status. He had to resign due to the changing political regime in Kazakhstan. He ended his public service career in his home village, Pidgim, in Almaty Province, where he stayed in power until 1995 as Director of the Collective Farm. Mashurov's position was impacted negatively by Perestroika that first had a detrimental effect on rural agriculture. He died of a heart attack at age 60 in his home in Zharkent. In 2005, his wife, Durnyam Mashurova, published the novel "A Life Lived Not in Vain"(comprising memoirs about his life.

His daughter, Dilyaram Azatovna Masimova, is the wife of former Kazakh prime minister Karim Massimov.

References

External links
"A Life Lived Not in Vain" Book Review by Dr. Lee B Croft
Durnyam Mashurova's Blog

1940 births
2000 deaths
Uyghurs
Communist Party of Kazakhstan politicians